Brunhilde Pomsel (11 January 1911 – 27 January 2017) was a personal secretary to Joseph Goebbels, the Reich Minister of Propaganda of Nazi Germany. She started work at the ministry's offices in the Ordenspalais opposite the Reich Chancellery in Berlin in 1942. In 2014, aged 103, she gave a series of interviews for a film documentary entitled A German Life. She told the interviewer, "It is absolutely not about clearing my conscience" and that "[N]o one believes me now, but I knew nothing". The film was released in 2016 when she was 105 years old.

Biography
Pomsel was born in Berlin in 1911. Her first two employers were Jews: first, a Jewish-owned clothing store where she worked as an assistant, then Dr. Hugo Goldberg, a lawyer and insurance agent."I obviously didn't tell him that on January 30, 1933, I cheered Hitler at the Brandenburg Gate ... You can’t do something like that to a poor Jew."

Later in 1933, she voted for Hitler and joined the Nazi Party. She got a job in the news department of the government radio station. On the recommendation of a friend, she was transferred to the Reich Ministry of Public Enlightenment and Propaganda in 1942, where she worked under Joseph Goebbels as a stenographer until the end of the war. According to Kate Connolly in the Guardian, she was more than just a secretary/stenographer; her tasks included "massaging downwards statistics about fallen soldiers, as well as exaggerating the number of rapes of German women by the Red Army". At the end of the war in 1945, Pomsel was imprisoned by the Soviet NKVD until 1950 in three different concentration camps, Buchenwald, Hohenschönhausen and Sachsenhausen. She was released from the NKVD camp in 1950, and escaped from the Soviet-occupied zone to West Germany, where she worked as a secretary with the state broadcaster Südwestfunk in Baden-Baden and then at ARD in Munich until her retirement in 1971. 

On her 100th birthday in 2011, she publicly spoke out against Goebbels. A documentary called A German Life, drawn from a 30-hour interview with Pomsel, was shown at Filmfest München  in 2016. An award-winning theatre play (monologue with Dame Maggie Smith) of the same name was performed at the Bridge Theatre in London in 2019.

Shortly before her death she claimed she had been in love with a man named Gottfried Kirchbach, who had a Jewish mother. They planned to leave Germany together. In 1936, Kirchbach fled to Amsterdam. She visited him regularly until he told her she was endangering her life by doing so. She aborted their child after a doctor advised her the pregnancy might kill her because she had a serious lung complaint.

Towards the end of her life, Pomsel lived in Munich-Schwabing. She died there on 27 January 2017 at the age of 106.

See also
 List of centenarians (miscellaneous)

References

1911 births
2017 deaths
German broadcasters
German centenarians
Nazi Party members
People from Berlin
Secretaries
Stenographers
Women centenarians